Brighton & Hove Albion Football Club, commonly referred to simply as Brighton, is an English professional football club based in the city of Brighton and Hove. They compete in the Premier League, the top tier of the English football league system. The club's home ground is the 31,800-capacity Falmer Stadium in Falmer, north east of Brighton.

Founded in 1901, and nicknamed the "Seagulls" or "Albion", Brighton played their early professional football in the Southern League, before being elected to the Football League in 1920. Prior to the current, continuing stint in the Premier League, the club enjoyed greatest prominence between 1979 and 1983 when they played in the First Division and reached the 1983 FA Cup Final, losing to Manchester United after a replay. They were relegated from the First Division in the same season.

By the late 1990s, Brighton were in the fourth tier of English football and were having financial difficulties. After narrowly avoiding relegation from the Football League to the Conference in 1997, a boardroom takeover saved the club from liquidation. Successive promotions in 2001 and 2002 brought Brighton back to the second tier, and in 2011, the club moved into the Falmer Stadium after 14 years without a permanent home ground. In the 2016–17 season, Brighton finished second in the EFL Championship and were thus promoted to the Premier League, ending a 34-year absence from the top flight.

History

Formation and early years (1901–1972)
Brighton & Hove Albion F.C. were founded in 1901 and 19 years later, in 1920, they were elected to the Football League's new Third Division – having previously been members of the Southern League. In the Southern League they won their only national honour to date, the FA Charity Shield, which at that time was contested by the champions of the Southern League, and the Football League, by defeating Football League Champions Aston Villa in 1910. Following their switch to the regionalised division three south in 1921, they remained in this division until the 1957–1958 season, when they won the title and secured promotion to the Second Division at the same time as the regionalised north and south divisions de-regionalised into a third and fourth division for the 1958–1959 season. Albion retained their second tier status until relegation in 1962, suffering a successive relegation in 1963 and slipping into the fourth division for the first time. They won the fourth division title in 1964-1965 and remained in the third division until 1972 when as runners up they secured promotion back to the second division.

Mike Bamber years (1972–1987)
Mike Bamber was the chairman of Brighton from October 1972 until 1983. He famously brought Brian Clough to the club in 1973 and later appointed former England player Alan Mullery as manager. Brighton's life as a Football League club had brought little in the way of success and headlines until 1979, when, under Mullery's management, they were promoted to the First Division as Second Division runners-up. The 1982/83 season saw a wildly inconsistent start for the club, with victories over Arsenal and Manchester United mixed in with heavy defeats. Manager Mike Bailey eventually lost his job at the start of December 1982. Jimmy Melia took over as manager, but was unable to turn the situation around and Brighton, after four seasons in the top flight, were relegated in 1983, finishing in last place.

Despite their relegation, that season Brighton reached their first (and only to date) FA Cup final and drew 2–2 with Manchester United in the first match. Brighton's goals were scored by Gordon Smith and Gary Stevens. The final featured an infamous "miss" by Gordon Smith with virtually the last kick of the game in extra time, prompting the BBC commentator Peter Jones to utter the well-known phrase "...and Smith must score".  However, Smith's kick was saved by the Manchester United goalkeeper, Gary Bailey. In the replay, Manchester United won 4–0.

Relegation, last years, and saved by Knight (1987–1997)

After four seasons, relegation to Division Three came in 1987, but the Albion were promoted back the next season. In 1991 they lost the play-off final at Wembley to Notts County 3–1, only to be relegated the next season to the newly-named Division Two. In 1996 further relegation came to Division Three. The club's financial situation was becoming increasingly precarious, and the club's directors decided that the Goldstone Ground would have to be sold to pay off some of the club's large debts. Manager Jimmy Case was sacked, after a very poor start to the 1996–97 season left Brighton at the bottom of the league by a considerable margin. The club's directors appointed Steve Gritt, the former joint manager of Charlton Athletic, as manager -- Gritt was relatively unknown. Brighton's league performance steadily improved under Gritt, although their improving chances of survival were put under further threat by a two-point deduction by the Football Association, imposed as punishment for a pitch invasion by fans who were protesting against the sale of the Goldstone ground. A lifelong fan named Dick Knight took control of the club in 1997 having led the fan pressure to oust the previous board following their sale of the club's Goldstone Ground to property developers.

By the last day of the season, after being 13 points adrift at one stage, they had risen from the bottom of the division table and had to play the team directly below them, Hereford United, to retain their position in the league. If Brighton won or drew, they would be safe. Brighton defender Kerry Mayo scored an own goal in the first half, and it appeared that Brighton's 77-year league career was over. But a late goal from Robbie Reinelt ensured that Brighton retained their league status, based on number of goals scored (despite Hereford having a better goal difference as, in the Football League at the time, goals scored took precedence), and Hereford's 25-year league run was instead over.

Withdean era and Bloom takeover (1997–2011)
The sale of the Goldstone Ground went through in 1997, leading to Brighton having to play some 70 miles away at Gillingham's Priestfield stadium for two seasons. Micky Adams was appointed Brighton's manager in 1999. For the start of the 1999–2000 season the Seagulls secured a lease to play home games at Withdean Stadium, a converted athletics track in Brighton owned by the local council. 2000–01 was Brighton's first successful season for 13 years. They were crowned champions of Division Three and promoted to Division Two. Adams left in October 2001 to work as Dave Bassett's assistant at Leicester, being replaced by former Leicester manager Peter Taylor. The transition proved to be a plus point for Brighton, who maintained their good form and ended the season as Division Two champions – winning a second successive promotion. Just five years after almost succumbing to the double threat of losing their Football League status and going out of business completely, Brighton were one division away from the Premier League.

In May 2009, Knight was replaced as chairman at Brighton by Tony Bloom, who successfully secured £93 million funding for the new Falmer Stadium and 75% shareholding at the club.

Brighton's final season at Withdean was 2010–11, in which they won League One under the management of Gus Poyet. The following season, Brighton changed their crest to a design similar to the crest used from the 1970s to the 1990s. This was to reflect on the club returning home after not having a stadium since 1997.

Move to new stadium and promotion under Hughton (2011–2017)
The Falmer Stadium hosted its first league match on the opening day of the 2011–12 season against Doncaster Rovers, who were the last opposition to play at the Goldstone in 1997. The game finished 2–1 to Albion. The 2012–13 season saw Brighton finish 4th and lose in the play-off semi-finals to Crystal Palace. Poyet was suspended as manager following controversial comments made in his post-match interview, and was later sacked as manager and replaced by Óscar García.

On the final day of the 2013–14 season, Brighton beat Nottingham Forest 2–1 with a last minute winner from Leonardo Ulloa to secure a 6th-place finish. After losing to Derby County in the play-offs semi-finals, García resigned. Ex-Liverpool defender Sami Hyypiä was appointed manager for the 2014–15 season but resigned after just four months due to a poor run of results. He was replaced by former Norwich manager Chris Hughton. In the following campaign Brighton challenged for promotion again, buoyed by  a 21-game unbeaten run from the opening day to 19 December. On the final day of the season Brighton travelled to Middlesbrough and needed to win to secure promotion to the Premier League, but a 1–1 draw meant 3rd and a play-off place, where defeat to Sheffield Wednesday was Brighton's third playoff semi-final defeat in four seasons.

Brighton started 2016–17 with an 18-match unbeaten run, taking them to the top of the league for much of December and January. They remained in the automatic promotion positions for most of the rest of the season, and clinched promotion to the Premier League after a 2–1 win against Wigan Athletic at home on 17 April 2017. They broke their transfer record multiple times throughout the summer window, with the previous club record signing of Jose Izquierdo commanding a fee reported to be over £13 million.

Back in the top division (2017–present)
Brighton's first season in the Premier League was largely successful, with the club rising into the top half several times in the season. Despite falling to one point above the relegation zone in January, victories over Arsenal and Manchester United in the final months of the campaign helped secure a finish of 15th.

Despite a promising start to their second season in the Premier League, the team endured poor results in the later stages, achieving just 3 wins in their last 18 games. In the FA Cup, Brighton reached the semi-finals for the first time since 1983, losing 1–0 to Manchester City. Albion ultimately survived relegation with a 17th-place finish, but Hughton was sacked following the end of the season due to the poor run of results.

Following Hughton's sacking, Swansea manager Graham Potter was appointed as the new head coach on a four-year contract. The contract was extended by a further 2 years in November 2019. From March to June 2020, the season was suspended due to the COVID-19 pandemic. Brighton finished 15th and 16th in Potter's first two seasons, securing a historic fifth season in the Premier League in May 2021 that ensured their current spell in the top flight exceeded their previous run from 1979-83.

The club's 2021–22 season saw a 9th place finish in the Premier League, the highest Brighton have ever finished in English top flight football, with a record tally of 51 points. This also marked Brighton's 9th season overall in the English top flight. In September 2022, Potter left the club to become head coach of Chelsea, following the dismissal of Thomas Tuchel.

On 18 September 2022, Brighton announced Roberto De Zerbi as the club's new head coach.

Home stadium

Goldstone Ground

For 95 years Brighton and Hove Albion were based at the Goldstone Ground in Hove, until the board of directors decided to sell the stadium. The sale, implemented by majority shareholder Bill Archer and his chief executive David Bellotti, proved controversial, and the move provoked widespread protests against the board. The club received little if any money from this sale.

In their last season at the Goldstone, 1996–97, the Seagulls were in danger of relegation from the Football League. They won their final game at the Goldstone against Doncaster Rovers, setting up a winner-takes-all relegation game at Hereford United, who were level on points with the Seagulls. Brighton drew 1–1, and Hereford were relegated to the Football Conference on goals scored.

Withdean Stadium

For two years, from 1997 to 1999, the club shared Priestfield Stadium, the ground of Gillingham, before returning to Brighton to play at Withdean Stadium. This is not predominantly a football ground, having been used for athletics throughout most of its history, and previously as a zoo.

Because of the cost of the public enquiry into planning permission for a new stadium, rent on Withdean Stadium, fees paid to use Gillingham's Priestfield Stadium, and a general running deficit due to the low ticket sales inherent with a small ground, the club had an accumulated deficit of £9.5 million in 2004. The board of directors paid £7 million of this; the other £2.5 million had to be raised from the operations of the club. In an effort to achieve this, a fund-raising appeal known as the Alive and Kicking Fund was started, with everything from nude Christmas Cards featuring the players to a CD single being released to raise cash. On 9 January 2005 this fund-raising single 'Tom Hark' went straight in at number 17 in the UK chart, gaining it national airplay on BBC Radio 1.

Falmer Stadium

The club's home ground is Falmer Stadium, currently known for sponsorship reasons as American Express Community Stadium or Amex Stadium, located in Village Way, Brighton.

On 28 October 2005, the Office of the Deputy Prime Minister announced that the application for Falmer had been successful, much to the joy and relief of all the fans. Lewes District Council contested John Prescott's decision to approve planning permission for Falmer, forcing a judicial review. This was based on a minor error in Prescott's original approval which neglected to state that some car parking for the stadium is in the Lewes district as opposed to the Brighton & Hove unitary authority. This caused further delay. Once the judicial review ruled in favour of the stadium, Lewes District Council said that it would not launch any further appeals.

Building of Falmer Stadium started in December 2008. On 31 May 2011 the club officially completed the handover and was given the keys to the stadium with an initial capacity of 22,374 seats, signifying the end of 14 years without a designated home. During January 2012, the club submitted an application to Brighton and Hove City council to increase the stadium capacity by a further 8,000 seats as well as to add additional corporate boxes, new television facilities and a luxury suite. This was granted unanimously by Brighton & Hove City Council's planning committee on 25 April 2012. The stadium was then expanded to 27,250 for the start of the 2012–13 season and then further to 27,750 during December 2012 before reaching 30,750 during May 2013.

In 2020, the club submitted plans to expand the stadium from 30,750 seats to 32,500 including additional hospitality. In 2021, the stadium was expanded to 31,800 with additional works yet to be done.

Rivalries
Despite the almost  distance between the two clubs, Crystal Palace are Brighton's main rival, dating back to the 1970s and hostility between managers Alan Mullery and Terry Venables, who both took charge of Brighton and Palace respectively in 1976 ahead of a close season in the Third Division which saw both Palace and Brighton vying for the title with Mansfield Town. The season finished with both Palace and Brighton beaten to the title by Mansfield, however, both sides were promoted and the hostility between the two managers had forged an intense rivalry between both teams, which continued into the following season in the Second Division as Brighton, who had finished their season at the top, fell into second after Palace won a previously postponed game against Burnley the following weekend to beat Brighton to the title by one point. In addition, the A23 road runs directly between Brighton and Croydon, where Palace's Selhurst Park stadium is based, has led to the media labelling the rivalry as both the A23 and M23 derby, although fans of both clubs do not use this term.

Situated in East Sussex, Brighton find themselves isolated from most other teams, leaving them without an established local derby. Matches against fellow south coast outfits Southampton and Portsmouth are occasionally labelled as local derbies by the media, but most fans of either team do not consider the other to be their rivals due to the over  distance between the clubs, and the already well-established rivalry between Southampton and Portsmouth.

Players

Current first-team squad

Out on loan

Under 21s and academy

The following academy players have featured in a matchday squad for the 2022–23 season

Managers

  John Jackson 1901–1910
  Frank Scott-Walford 1905–1908
  Jack Robson 1908–1914
  Charlie Webb 1919–1947
  Tommy Cook 1947
  Don Welsh 1947–1951
  Billy Lane 1951–1961
  George Curtis 1961–1963
  Archie Macaulay 1963–1968
  Freddie Goodwin 1968–1970
  Pat Saward 1970–1973
  Brian Clough 1973–1974
  Peter T. Taylor 1974–1976
  Alan Mullery 1976–1981
  Mike Bailey 1981–1982
  Jimmy Melia 1982–1983
  Chris Cattlin 1983–1986
  Alan Mullery 1986–1987
  Barry Lloyd 1987–1993
  Liam Brady 1993–1995
  Jimmy Case 1995–1996
  Steve Gritt 1996–1998
  Brian Horton 1998–1999
  Jeff Wood 1999
  Micky Adams 1999–2001
  Peter J. Taylor 2001–2002
  Martin Hinshelwood 2002
  Steve Coppell 2002–2003
  Mark McGhee 2003–2006
  Dean Wilkins 2006–2008
  Micky Adams 2008–2009
  Russell Slade 2009
  Gus Poyet 2009–2013
  Óscar García 2013–2014
  Sami Hyypiä 2014
  Chris Hughton 2014–2019
  Graham Potter 2019–2022
  Roberto De Zerbi 2022–

Current management team

Personnel

Club officials

Honours

League
Second Division/Championship (Tier 2) 
 Runners up: 1978–79, 2016–17
Third Division South//League One (Tier 3) 
Champions: 1957–58, 2001–02, 2010–11
Fourth Division/Third Division (Tier 4) 
Champions: 1964–65, 2000–01
Southern League 
 Champions: 1909–10

Cups
FA Cup 
Runners-up: 1983
FA Charity Shield 
Winners: 1910
Sussex Senior Challenge Cup 
Winners (15): 1942–43, 1987–88, 1991–92, 1993–94, 1994–95, 1999–00, 2003–04, 2006–07, 2007–08, 2009–10, 2010–11, 2012–13, 2016–17, 2017–18, 2021–22
 The Sussex Royal Ulster Rifles Charity Cup 
Winners: 1959–60, 1960–61

Colours and crest
For most of Brighton's history they have played in blue & white shirts, usually striped, with different combinations of white and blue shorts and socks, though this changed to all white briefly in the 1970s and again to plain royal blue in the early 1980s, which coincided with the most successful spell up to that point in the club's history, only to be bettered four decades later.

Since 2014 the club's kit has been manufactured by Nike. Previous manufacturers include Bukta (1971–74. 1975–80), Admiral (1974–75, 1994–97), Umbro (1975–77), Adidas (1980–87), Spall (1987–89), Sports Express (1989–91), Ribero (1991–94), Superleague (1997–99), and Erreà (1999–2014).
Their current shirt sponsors are American Express. Previous sponsors have included British Caledonian Airways (1980–83), Phoenix Brewery (1983–86), NOBO (1986–91), TSB Bank (1991–93), Sandtex (1993–98), Donatello (1998–99), Skint Records (1999–2008), IT First (2008–11), and BrightonandHoveJobs.com (2011–13).

References

External links

 

 
EFL Championship clubs
Sport in Brighton and Hove
Association football clubs established in 1901
Southern Football League clubs
1901 establishments in England
Football clubs in East Sussex
Football clubs in England
Premier League clubs
Former English Football League clubs